The Copa Galicia (Galicia Cup) is a basketball competition between the best teams of Galicia, Spain, organized by the Galician Basketball Federation, since 1986. CB Breogán is the last winner, in 2018.

History

Titles by team

Latest editions

Vigo 2007 

Liga EBA stage Group A

Liga EBA stage Group B

LEB teams stage

Ponteareas 2008 

Liga EBA stage Group A

LEB stage

Liga EBA stage Group B

Previous knockout stage

Final Four

O Porriño 2009 

LEB teams round

Final Four

Lalín 2010 

Group A

Group B

Group C

Group D

Final Four

Noia 2011 
A Final Four was played directly between the top four teams in Galicia.

Ourense 2012 
The format was similar as in the 2011 edition, with Obradoiro CAB as Liga ACB and the three LEB Oro teams.

Santiago de Compostela 2013
A draw decided which two Liga ACB or LEB Oro would qualify directly to the semifinals. The other two teams will play the previous round at the court of the LEB Plata teams.

Lugo 2014

Ourense 2015

2016 edition
The 2016 edition was played by the four LEB Oro teams, Xuventude Cambados of LEB Plata and Obradoiro CAB of Liga ACB, who directly joins the competition in the final. The semifinal and the final both will be played at Noia.

2017 edition
The three LEB Oro teams and LEB Plata team Xuventude Baloncesto played a preliminary round, where the two first qualified for the semifinal, played in Marín. The winner would play against Obradoiro CAB, the Galician Liga ACB.

2018 edition
LEB Oro and LEB Plata teams played the first stage, where the two first qualified ones joined the semifinal with the two Liga ACB teams.

2019 edition
Five teams joined the competition, with Obradoiro CAB joining directly the final as the only ACB team of the region.

Notes

References

External links 
 Federación Galega de Baloncesto

Ga
Sport in Galicia (Spain)